Walewice  is a village in the administrative district of Gmina Bielawy, within Łowicz County, Łódź Voivodeship, in central Poland, on the Bzura River.

It is the site of a 19th-century palace that belonged to Anastazy Colonna-Walewski, who was chamberlain of King Stanislaus Augustus Poniatowski.  Walewice attracts tourists because Napoleon Bonaparte had a love affair with Countess Walewska, who bore their son, Alexandre Walewski, at the palace in Walewice.

References

Villages in Łowicz County
Łódź Voivodeship (1919–1939)